Odisha State Highway 7 is a state highway in the state of Odisha, India.

7